James 3 is the third chapter of the Epistle of James in the New Testament of the Christian Bible. The author identifies himself as "James, a servant of God and of the Lord Jesus Christ" and the epistle is traditionally attributed to James the brother of Jesus, written in Jerusalem between 48 and 61 CE. Alternatively, some scholars argue that it is a pseudographical work written after 61 CE. This chapter contains an exposition about wisdom and humility.

Text
The original text was written in Koine Greek. This chapter is divided into 18 verses.

Textual witnesses
Some early manuscripts containing the text of this chapter in Greek are:
Papyrus 20 (early 3rd century; extant verses 1–9)
Papyrus 100 (late 3rd century; extant verses 13–18)
Codex Vaticanus (325-350)
Codex Sinaiticus (330-360)
Codex Alexandrinus (400-440)
Codex Ephraemi Rescriptus (ca. 450)
Papyrus 54 (5th century; extant verses 2–4)
Papyrus 74 (7th century; complete)

An ancient manuscript containing this chapter in the Coptic language is: 
Papyrus 6 (~AD 350; all verses).

Ethics of Speech for Teachers (3:1–12)

Verse 1
 My brethren, let not many of you become teachers, knowing that we shall receive a stricter judgment.
Joyce Meyer consider all believers in Christian faith are 'teachers in some way or another', because although they don't quote Bible verses or say spiritual things, their behavior becomes a tool to 'teach by example', teaching people around them about Christianity without realizing it, and can do more harm than good if they fail to behave as Christians.

Verse 2
 “For we all stumble in many things. If anyone does not stumble in word, he is a [a]perfect man, able also to bridle the whole body.”

Verse 5
Even so the tongue is a little member and boasts great things.
See how great a forest a little fire kindles!
The danger of the human tongue is a popular theme in Jewish wisdom tradition, with many warnings placed in the Book of Proverbs (for examples, see ; ;), as well as in Wisdom 1:11; Sirach 5:13; 19:16; 25:8b; 28:17-18, 22, and in rabbinical literature (Abot 6:6; Lev. Rab. 16:4 [on Leviticus 14:2]; b. 'Arak. 15b; b. Ber. 17a). Several scrolls from Qumran also contain similar advice, such as 1QS 10:21-24; 4Q525 2 ii 1; 14 ii 25–27; and 4Q436 1 i 7–10.

Verse 6
And the tongue is a fire, a world of iniquity.
The tongue is so set among our members that it defiles the whole body, and sets on fire the course of nature; and it is set on fire by hell.
"The tongue is a fire": Fire can be very useful to warm and comfort when used properly, and so is the tongue in conversation and ministry of the word. However, as fire should be carefully controlled, so should Christians be careful that they don't sin with their tongue and always keep their lips from speaking evil. Fire can kindle and rise up into a flame, like angry, passionate words can stir up the flame of lust, anger, envy, and revenge, also spreading when lies, scandal, and evil reports vented by the tongue; and as fire devours all that comes in its way, such are the words of an evil tongue; and therefore are called devouring words they devour the good names of men, corrupt their good manners, and destroy those who make use of them; and what wood is to fire, and coals to burning coals, that are whisperers, tale bearers, backbiters, and contentious persons to strife,

 "A world of iniquity": points to the world which is full of sin, for it lies in wickedness, so is the tongue full of iniquity, existing as a world of its own. The Jewish commentaries state that one who uses an evil tongue multiplies transgression, and that it is equal to idolatry, adultery, and murder, and the cause of all sin, as expressed using the fable, as follows:

The Syriac version renders this clause as "and the world of iniquity is as wood", referring to a branch of a tree, in the sense that the tongue is fire, and the wicked world is fuel to it.

 "The course of nature": or "wheel of nature", that is, the natural body, where there is a continual rotation or circulation of the blood, by which it is supported.

"Set on fire by hell": that is, by the devil as its habitation (cf. Matthew 16:18), in contrast to the "heaven" as the dwelling of God (Matthew 21:25, Luke 15:18), and the sense is, that the tongue is influenced and instigated by Satan to speak many evil things, and later be set on fire in hell, as the tongue of the rich man in Luke 16:24, as implied in the Talmud:

The Meekness of Wisdom (3:13–18)

Verse 16
New King James Version
 For where envy and self-seeking exist, confusion and every evil thing are there.

See also
 Jesus Christ
 Tongue
 Related Bible parts: 1 Corinthians 10, James 1

References

Sources

External links
 King James Bible - Wikisource
English Translation with Parallel Latin Vulgate 
Online Bible at GospelHall.org (ESV, KJV, Darby, American Standard Version, Bible in Basic English)
Multiple bible versions at Bible Gateway (NKJV, NIV, NRSV etc.)

03